Gerhard Höllerich (25 January 1943 – 9 October 1991), known professionally as Roy Black, was a German schlager singer and actor, who appeared in several musical comedies and starred in the 1989 TV series, Ein Schloß am Wörthersee.

Biography
Born in Bobingen, Bavarian Swabia, Germany, Black attended the Holbein Gymnasium in Augsburg and, aged 20, founded the rock and roll band Roy Black and His Cannons. His stage name derived from his black hair and his idol, Roy Orbison.

Roy Black and His Cannons achieved some local fame and were offered a recording contract with Polydor Records. However, his record producer Hans Bertram decided on a solo career for Black, and a switch to romantic songs for his protégé, a decision which soon led to nationwide fame. In 1966, his single "Ganz in Weiß"—a romantic song about marrying in white—sold in excess of one million copies by the end of 1967. His 1969 song "Dein schönstes Geschenk", sold one million copies by May 1970, having spent nine weeks at number one in the German chart.

From 1967, Black also took on roles in several musical comedy films, for example in the 1969 movie Help, I Love Twins opposite Uschi Glas.

In 1974, Black announced his engagement to model Silke Vagts (1945–2002), and the couple got married in Munich the same year. In 1976 their son Torsten was born. They divorced in 1985.

Six years later, Black died of heart failure, in Heldenstein near Mühldorf am Inn.

In 1996 the Television film  was produced, starring Christoph Waltz as Roy Black.

There is a small monument to Black in Velden am Wörthersee, Austria

During the night of 18 September 2020 the monument, which had been renewed a few days earlier, was stolen by still unknown perpetrators.

On 22 September 2020 the Bust, which had been stolen, turned up in the garden of an inn in Velden.

Discography 
 1966 - Roy Black
 1967 - Roy Black 2
 1968 - Ich denk' an Dich
 1969 - Ich hab' Dich lieb
 1969 - Concerto d'amour
 1970 - Im Land der Lieder
 1970 - Für Dich allein
 1971 - Wo bist Du?
 1971 - Eine Liebesgeschichte
 1972 - Träume in Samt und Seele
 1972 - Wunderbar ist die Welt
 1973 - Grün ist die Heide
 1973 - Hier und mit Dir
 1974 - Roy Black und die Fischer-Chöre (with the Fischer-Chöre)
 1976 - Liebe, wie sie Dir gefällt
 1978 - Neue Lieder
 1986 - Herzblut
 1988 - Schwarz auf weiß
 1989 - Ein Hauch von Sinnlichkeit
 1990 - Zeit für Zärtlichkeit
 1991 - Rosenzeit

Awards
 1966: Bravo Otto in silver
 1967: Bravo Otto in gold
 1968: Bravo Otto in gold
 1968: Goldene Europa
 1969: Bravo Otto in gold
 1970: Bravo Otto in gold
 1970: Goldene Europa
 1971: Bravo Otto in silver
 1971: Goldene Europa
 1972: Bravo Otto in bronze
 1972: 
 1980: Hermann-Löns-Medaille
 1981: Goldene Stimmgabel
 1984: Goldene Stimmgabel
 1989: Goldene Stimmgabel
 1990: Goldene Stimmgabel

Selected filmography
Paradies der flotten Sünder (1968), as Nick Dreamer
Always Trouble with the Teachers (with Uschi Glas, 1968), as Peter Hartung
Our Doctor is the Best (with Helga Anders, 1969), as Dr. Leonhard Sommer
Help, I Love Twins (with Uschi Glas, 1969), as Andy Hard
When You're With Me (with Zienia Merton, 1970), as Chris Bergen
Who Laughs Last, Laughs Best (with Uschi Glas, 1971), as Robby Mertens
Wenn mein Schätzchen auf die Pauke haut (with Uschi Glas, 1971), as Kristian Wernher
The Reverend Turns a Blind Eye (with Uschi Glas, 1971), as Michael Springer
The Heath Is Green (with Monika Lundi, 1972), as Norbert
Old Barge, Young Love (with Barbara Nielsen, 1973), as Mark Tanner
Ein Schloß am Wörthersee (1990–1991, TV series, 21 episodes), as Lennie Berger

References

External links
 

1943 births
1991 deaths
People from Augsburg (district)
German pop singers
German male film actors
Schlager musicians
20th-century German male singers
20th-century German male actors